Michael Fuhrer is a US/Australian physicist recognised internationally as a pioneer in atomically-thin (two-dimensional) materials, including graphene and novel topological materials, with expertise in fabrication and characterisation of their electronic and optical properties.

He is founding Director of ARC Centre of Excellence in Future Low-Energy Electronics Technologies (FLEET), an Australian research centre developing ultra-low energy electronics based on technologies including topological materials, exciton superfluids, non-equilibrium physics, atomically-thin materials and nanodevice fabrication.

Fuhrer is an Australian Research Council Laureate Fellow.

Education
Fuhrer was educated at the University of Texas at Austin gaining a bachelor's degree in Physics 1990, and at the University of California, Berkeley, gaining a PhD in Physics in 1998, under the supervision of Alex Zettl.

Career and research
After postdoctoral research at Berkeley in collaboration with Profs. Paul McEuen, Alex Zettl, Marvin Cohen, and Steven Louie, Fuhrer joined the University of Maryland, College Park as an Assistant Professor in 2000, from 2009-2012 was Professor of Physics, and from 2009-2013 he directed the Center for Nanophysics and Advanced Materials at Maryland. He joined the School of Physics and Astronomy at Monash University, Melbourne Australia as a Professor in 2013. He was the founding Director of the Monash Centre for Atomically-Thin Materials (founded 2015).

Achievements
Fuhrer has pioneered the study of the electronic properties of 2D materials, making the first quantitative measurements of the resistivity of graphene due to charged impurities, defects, and phonons, demonstrating the intrinsic conductivity of graphene at room temperature is higher than any other material. He demonstrated the first atomically thin MoS2 transistors, and made the first measurements of the minimum conductivity and electron-phonon scattering in topological insulator Bi2Se3. In 2017 he demonstrated that the topological material trisodium bismuthide (Na3Bi) can be manufactured to be as 'electronically smooth' as the highest-quality graphene-based alternative, while maintaining graphene's high electron mobility.

Fuhrer has published 136 papers cited over 17,000 times, for an h-index of 41. Nine of Fuhrer's papers have been cited more than 500 times.

Honours and awards
Michael is a Fellow of the American Association for the Advancement of Science and the American Physical Society, and an Australian Research Council Laureate Fellow.

Core expertise
Fuhrer's expertise includes:

 The physical electronic properties of atomically thin materials, such as graphene, and their applications
 Development of low energy electronics to boost sustainability outcomes
 Research into ‘topological’ phases of matter, such as topological insulators and topological semimetals, and their application in future electronics
 Topological insulator thin films
 Atomically thin semiconductors, such as monolayer molybdenum disulphide and tungsten disulphide
 scanning probe techniques (scanning tunneling microscopy, atomic force microscopy)

References

Living people
Australian physicists
Quantum physicists
Australian nanotechnologists
Academic staff of Monash University
Fellows of the Australian Academy of Science
University of California, Berkeley alumni
University of Texas at Austin College of Natural Sciences alumni
Year of birth missing (living people)
Fellows of the American Physical Society